The 2019 IIHF World Championship was hosted from 10 to 26 May 2019 by Slovakia. It was the second time that Slovakia has hosted the event as an independent country, as was the case in 2011. The host cities were Bratislava and Košice, as announced by the International Ice Hockey Federation (IIHF) on 15 May 2015 in Prague, Czech Republic.

Finland won their third title by defeating Canada in the final. The Finns had 18 first-timers for the 2019 IIHF World Championship and were widely regarded as an outsider to win any medal at all. Despite this, the Finns won their third World Championship and lost only two games in the tournament (against the USA, and Germany). Russia secured the bronze medal after a penalty-shootout win over the Czech Republic. This tournament was also the first time since the 2006 IIHF World Championship that both promoted teams (Great Britain and Italy) stayed in the top division.

Venues

Rule changes
In December 2018, the IIHF announced changes to the overtime procedures beginning at this tournament: all overtime periods would be 3-on-3 regardless of round (rather than progressing from 3-on-3 to 4-on-4 and 5-on-5 over the course of the tournament), and the gold medal game would no longer go to a shootout; play would continue in 20-minute periods of 3-on-3 until a winning goal would be scored.

In the semifinals, there was no set bracket. After the quarterfinals, a re-seeding took place with the highest seed plays the lowest remaining seed. Seeds were determined by performance in the preliminary round.

Participants

 Qualified as host

 Automatic qualifier after a top 14 placement at the 2018 IIHF World Championship

 Qualified through winning a promotion at the 2018 IIHF World Championship Division I

Seeding
The seedings in the preliminary round are based on the 2018 IIHF World Ranking, as of the end of the 2018 IIHF World Championship, using the serpentine system. On 22 May 2018, the IIHF and the local organizing committee announced the groups, in which Slovakia and Norway switched places so that Slovakia would play in Košice and the Czech Republic and Austria would play in Bratislava.

Group A (Košice)
 (1)
 (4)
 (5)
 (8)
 (10)
 (12)
 (13)
 (22)

Group B (Bratislava)
 (2)
 (3)
 (6)
 (7)
 (9)
 (11)
 (17)
 (19)

Rosters

Each team's roster consists of at least 15 skaters (forwards, and defencemen) and 2 goaltenders, and at most 22 skaters and 3 goaltenders. All 16 participating nations, through the confirmation of their respective national associations, had to submit a "Long List" no later than two weeks before the tournament, and a final roster by the Passport Control meeting prior to the start of the tournament.

Officials
16 referees and linesman were announced on 1 March 2019.

Preliminary round
The schedule was announced on  15 August 2018.

Group A

Group A matches were played at the Steel Arena in Košice.

Group B

Group B matches were played at the Ondrej Nepela Arena in Bratislava.

Playoff round

Seeding order 
The semi-final pairings were determined according to the seeding after the preliminary round. The seeding is determined by following criteria in the order presented:
higher position in the group;
higher number of points;
better goal difference;
higher number of goals scored for;
better seeding number entering the tournament (i.e., place in the 2018 IIHF World Ranking).

Bracket

Quarterfinals

Semifinals

Bronze medal game

Gold medal game

Final ranking and statistics

Final ranking

Scoring leaders
List shows the top skaters sorted by points, then goals.

GP = Games played; G = Goals; A = Assists; Pts = Points; +/− = Plus/minus; PIM = Penalties in minutes; POS = Position
Source: IIHF.com

Goaltending leaders
Only the top five goaltenders, based on save percentage, who have played at least 40% of their team's minutes, are included in this list.

TOI = Time on Ice (minutes:seconds); SA = Shots against; GA = Goals against; GAA = Goals against average; Sv% = Save percentage; SO = Shutouts
Source: IIHF.com

Awards
Best players selected by the directorate:
Best Goaltender:  Andrei Vasilevskiy
Best Defenceman:  Filip Hronek
Best Forward:  Nikita Kucherov
Source: IIHF.com

Media All-Stars:
MVP:  Mark Stone
Goaltender:  Andrei Vasilevskiy
Defencemen:  Filip Hronek /  Mikko Lehtonen
Forwards:  Mark Stone /  William Nylander /  Jakub Voráček
Source: IIHF.com

References

External links

 
2019
IIHF World Championship
2019 IIHF World Championship
2019 IIHF World Championship
2019 IIHF World Championship
IIHF World Championship
2010s in Bratislava
IIHF World Championship